Vanparys Confiserie B.V. is a Belgian confectionery company created in 1769 by Felix Vanparys in Brussels, near  Sablon, Belgium. The company produces chocolate and sugar-coated confections but specializes in dragées (sugar-coated chocolate and almonds), which feature often in Christian and Islamic traditions and celebrations. The recipe and the preparation of its dragées, dating back over 125 years ago, are still followed today.

In 2012, Vanparys extended its selection confections to include a range of chocolate-coated nuts, fruits, and coffee beans – as well as a variety of seasonal confectioneries such as praliné eggs and fondant chicks for Easter. Each season, Vanparys introduces a range of new colours to its palette.

Presently, the company is located in Evere, Brussels, and exports to many countries including the Netherlands, France, Luxembourg, UK, Germany, Poland, China, Turkey, Tunisia, Japan, and Portugal.

History

1889–1945: Early history 
The Vanparys confectionery business was created in 1769 when Felix Vanparys founded a small enterprise in Brussels on Ernest Allard Street specializing in the production of sugar-coated chocolate and almonds, otherwise known as dragées.

In 1922, Emile Vanparys (Felix's nephew) took control and relocated the growing production line to larger premises in Brussels. He improved the coating technique while also making the sweets more accessible in price. When almonds grew scarce due to a bad harvest across Europe, Emile decided to replace them with an almond-shaped nugget of chocolate. This new type of dragée was eventually copied by the competition and has since become more popular across Europe than the traditional almond ones. By 1935, the Vanparys business had grown to 80 employees, but over the next few years production faltered due to the Second World War.

1945–1998 
Progress resumed when the war ended. In 1945, Constant Vanparys took over the family business, and when its competitors had to stop producing dragées due to tough economic conditions, Vanparys recruited their staff. In 1957, Princess Grace of Monaco opted for yellow color dragées for the christening of her daughter Princess Caroline of Monaco, which led to the fact that colors other than blue, rose and white, came into vogue. Following that trend, Vanparys also expanded its range and introduced 25 additional colors the same year.

Modern history 
In 1990, the Belgian confectioner André De Greef, together with his two sons, assumed control of the company, the first non-family members to do so. Under their stewardship, much of the factory, based in Evere, Brussels was renovated.

Product range

Original collection 

 Chocolate Dragées
 Almond Dragées
 Chocolate & Sweet Mini Dragées
 Gold & Silver

Gourmet collection 
 Chocolate Coated Whole Fruit
 Chocolate Coated Almonds and Hazelnuts
 Chocolate Coated Almonds with a Fruity Sugar Coating
 Coffee & Chocolate

Cake Decorations 
 Vanparys Mini Range (confettis, mini-confettis and mini hearts)
 Silver & Gold (gold and silver pastry and cake toppings)
 Fondant Jesus (sugar baby Jesus figurine)
 Fondant Hen
 Non Pareil (colourful, extra small mini pearls)

Easter Products 
 Praliné Eggs (praliné eggs with a crunchy sugar coating)

References 

Food and drink companies based in Brussels
Food and drink companies established in 1889
Manufacturing companies based in Brussels
Belgian companies established in 1889